Guillaume Pitron (born 1980) is a French journalist, author and documentary maker. He specializes in the geopolitics of raw materials.

Career 
Guillaume Pitron holds a post-graduate law from the University of Paris and a master's degree in international law from Georgetown University.

He was a lawyer before becoming a journalist for Le Monde diplomatique, Geo and National Geographic.

He is the director of several documentaries related to the exploitation of raw materials, in particular "Boomerang: the dark side of the chocolate bar",  "Rare Earth: The Dirty War " and " The Dark Side of Green Energies" 

After 6 years of investigation, he published in 2018 a geopolitical book: "The Rare Metals War: The Dark Side Of the Energy Transition and Digitalization". His work focuses on economic, political and environmental issues related to the use of rare metals. He promotes the reopening of mines in France in order to avoid the export of nuisances to neighbouring countries and continents and to retain responsibility for the consequences of the energy transition.

Awards 

 2017 Erik Izraelewicz Economic Survey Award for its publication on the "Forest Sale" published in Le Monde diplomatique
 2018 Robertval Media Coup de cœur Award
 2018 Economy Book Price for "The Rare Metals War: The Dark Side Of the Energy Transition and Digitalization" 
 2019 Turgot Prize for the best financial economics book of the year 2018

Bibliography 
 Guillaume Pitron , "The rare metals war: the hidden face of the energy and digital transition", London, Scribe, translation Bianca Jacobsohn, 2020, 288 p.

References 

French journalists
1980 births
Living people